The 2000 Grand Prix of Charlotte was the second round of the 2000 American Le Mans Series season.  It took place at Lowe's Motor Speedway, North Carolina, on April 1, 2000.

Race results
Class winners in bold.

Statistics
 Pole Position - #42 BMW Motorsport - 1:04.096
 Fastest Lap - #1 Panoz Motor Sport - 1:05.524
 Distance - 452.628 km
 Average Speed - 163.796 km/h

References

Charlotte
Grand Prix of Charlotte